Folens is a major company in Irish educational publishing. It was founded by Albert Folens. Folens' mission is to provide outstanding educational tools that have a positive impact on teaching and learning, by responding to customers’ needs. Folens' vision is to make great learning easy.

Atlas and British Isles
In October, 2006, Folens announced that the new edition of Folens' atlas would no longer use the term "British Isles" in the new edition of its atlas, to be introduced the following January. According to the Irish Times, "John O'Connor of Folens insisted he had received no complaints from parents regarding the new atlas. The issue had, however, been brought to his attention by a geography teacher."

External links
 Folens' website
 Folens' Primary school books
 Folens' Post-Primary school books
 The Poor Mouth blog on the deletion of the phrase
 Folens' article on The Irish Examiner
 Folens' article on NewsTalk
 Folens' article on Shaping the Future DCU

References

Publishing companies of the Republic of Ireland
Book publishing companies of Ireland